
Year 143 BC was a year of the pre-Julian Roman calendar. At the time it was known as the Year of the Consulship of Pulcher and Macedonicus (or, less frequently, year 611 Ab urbe condita). The denomination 143 BC for this year has been used since the early medieval period, when the Anno Domini calendar era became the prevalent method in Europe for naming years.

Events 
 By place 
 Roman Republic 
 The Celtiberian War ends when Quintus Caecilius Metellus Macedonicus crushes the rebels.

Births 
 Marcus Antonius, Roman politician and orator (d. 87 BC)

Deaths 
 Jonathan Maccabaeus, Jewish leader of the Maccabees
 Zhou Yafu, Chinese general of the Han Dynasty

References